Moraxella oblonga is a  catalase- and oxidase-positive, Gram-negative bacterium in the genus Moraxella, which was isolated from the oral cavity of a sheep. Alysiella sp. was transferred to M. oblonga.

References

External links
Type strain of Moraxella oblonga at BacDive -  the Bacterial Diversity Metadatabase

Moraxellaceae
Bacteria described in 2005